The Lazarus Man is an American Western television series produced by Castle Rock Entertainment which first aired on January 20, 1996, and ended on November 9, 1996. Starring Robert Urich as the title character, The Lazarus Man debuted on TNT and ran for 20 episodes.

Opening narration

Plot
The setting for the series is Texas following the American Civil War. An amnesiac claws his way out of a shallow grave wearing a Confederate uniform and carrying a U.S. Army revolver. He is haunted by the memory of being attacked by a man wearing a derby. Calling himself Lazarus after the man resurrected by Jesus (John 11:41-44), he sets out to discover his true identity and the reason why he was buried alive.

Near the end of the series, Lazarus is revealed to be James Cathcart, a captain in the US Army and a member of President Abraham Lincoln's personal bodyguard detail. The memory that plagues him is from the night of April 14, 1865, when Lincoln was shot at Ford's Theatre. Cathcart, realizing that the President was in danger, ran to stop the assassin, but was attacked by his superior, the treasonous Major Talley, who wanted to see Lincoln dead.

Cancellation
The series first season did well enough to warrant TNT to order a second season. However, the series' production company, Castle Rock Entertainment, cancelled the series after Urich was diagnosed with synovial cell sarcoma in July 1996. Urich later sued Castle Rock for breach of contract. In the suit, Urich maintained that although he was undergoing cancer treatments, he never informed Castle Rock that he would be unable to perform in the series. Castle Rock decided to cancel the series anyway and failed to pay Urich the $1.47 million he was to be paid for a second season.

Episodes

DVD release
On February 13, 2018, The Lazarus Man: The Complete Series was released on DVD in Region 1 by Warner Bros. Home Entertainment via their Warner Archive Collection. This is a Manufacture-on-Demand (MOD) release available via WBShop.com & Amazon.com. The episodes appear out of chronological order on the DVDs.

References

External links

1996 American television series debuts
1996 American television series endings
1990s American drama television series
1990s Western (genre) television series
English-language television shows
Period television series
TNT (American TV network) original programming
Television series by Castle Rock Entertainment